José Manuel Abal Lores (born 15 July 1961) is a paralympic athlete from Spain competing mainly in category PW3-4 Pentathlon events.

Abal competed in two Paralympics, in 1992 in his home country and then in 1996 in Atlanta. In 1992 he competed in the marathon but failed to finish and then won silver in the pentathlon behind the world record performance of Czechoslovakia's Vojtěch Vašíček. In 1996 he finished well down the field in the pentathlon, finishing ninth overall, finished third in the discus, could only manage fifth in the heat of his 200 m and pulled out of the shot and javelin before the start.

Notes

References

External links
 
 

1961 births
Living people
Paralympic athletes of Spain
Paralympic silver medalists for Spain
Paralympic medalists in athletics (track and field)
Athletes (track and field) at the 1992 Summer Paralympics
Athletes (track and field) at the 1996 Summer Paralympics
Medalists at the 1992 Summer Paralympics
Spanish pentathletes